There were three medals issued by the British Government during the 19th and 20th Centuries for service in a series of wars in China fought by British and Imperial troops between 5 July 1840 and 31 December 1900. They all shared the same reverse and trophy of arms, with a similar ribbon, 39mm crimson with deep yellow edges.

 The China War Medal (1842) was issued for service during the First Opium War
 The China War Medal (1861) was issued for service in the Second Opium War
 The China War Medal (1900) was issued for service in the Boxer Rebellion

British campaign medals